Lisa Roman (born 17 September 1989) is a Canadian rower. She was part of the team that won the silver medal in the Women's eight competition at the 2014 World Rowing Championships.

In June 2016, she was officially named to Canada's 2016 Olympic team as part of the Women's Coxed Eight team. The team finished in 5th place.

She represented Canada at the 2020 Summer Olympics. At the Olympics, Roman won the gold medal in the women's eights boat, Canada's first in the event since 1992.

References

External links

Lisa Roman at RowingCanada

1989 births
Living people
People from Langley, British Columbia (city)
Canadian female rowers
Rowers at the 2016 Summer Olympics
Olympic rowers of Canada
World Rowing Championships medalists for Canada
Rowers at the 2020 Summer Olympics
Medalists at the 2020 Summer Olympics
Olympic medalists in rowing
Olympic gold medalists for Canada

Sportspeople from Surrey, British Columbia
21st-century Canadian women